The Tolomeo incandescent desk lamp is an icon of Italian modern design.  It was designed by Michele De Lucchi and Giancarlo Fassina in 1986 for the Artemide company. It won the Compasso d'Oro design prize in 1989.

It is a balanced-arm lamp with external steel tension cables attached to springs hidden inside the arms. Its original configuration was a desk lamp with a heavy base, two straight polished aluminium arm sections (each approximately 45 cm long), and a matte aluminium reflector head which can swivel 360°.  Many variants are now produced, including floor lamps and wall sconces.

Tolomeo is the Italian version of the name Ptolemy.

It is sometimes considered as the successor of Artemide's Tizio lamp, with the advantages of a swiveling shade.

In the dot-com period, it became popular as a symbol of conspicuous consumption and high design consciousness in high-tech companies as well as in architectural and graphic design offices.

References

External links

Official web site of Artemide
Comparison of constant tension lamp designs

Light fixtures
Compasso d'Oro Award recipients